The lesser hylomyscus or little wood mouse (Hylomyscus parvus) is a species of rodent in the family Muridae.
It is found in Cameroon, Central African Republic, Republic of the Congo, Democratic Republic of the Congo, Gabon, and possibly Equatorial Guinea.
Its natural habitat is subtropical or tropical moist lowland forests.

References

 Schlitter, D. & Van der Straeten, E. 2004.  Hylomyscus parvus.   2006 IUCN Red List of Threatened Species.   Downloaded on 19 July 2007.

Hylomyscus
Rodents of Africa
Mammals described in 1965
Taxonomy articles created by Polbot